Partha Pratim Roy is an Indian politician who currently serves as Chairman of North Bengal State Transport Corporation. He hails from the state of West Bengal. He is now the president of Cooch Behar District Trinamool Congress.

Life

His father was associated with Congress and  TMC for a decade. He came into Politics in his young age and became All India Youth Trinamool Congress District President.He was former Youth President of CoochBehar District Trinamool Congress. In 2016, he was elected to Lok Sabha from Cooch Behar parliamentary constituency of West Bengal on TMC ticket in a bye-election when the seat fell vacant due to the death of the sitting MP Renuka Sinha.He is currently District President of All India Trinamool Congress Coochbehar District Unit. Partha Pratim Ray is M.A in English,& Bachelor in Education from NorthBengal University. He is Special Officer in Confed under Department of co-operation, Government of West Bengal. Now he is the Chairman of North Bengal state Transport under Government of West Bengal and Chairman of Rogi Kalyan Samity, CoochBehar M.J.N Medical College & Hospital.

References

Year of birth missing (living people)
Living people
Trinamool Congress politicians from West Bengal
Lok Sabha members from West Bengal
India MPs 2014–2019
People from Cooch Behar district